ELhaj Adam Yousif (also spelled al-Haj Adam Youssef) was the Second Vice President of Sudan from September 13, 2011 to December 7, 2013.

References

Vice presidents of Sudan
National Congress Party (Sudan) politicians
Sudanese politicians
1955 births
Living people
People from South Darfur